French Historical Studies is a quarterly peer-reviewed academic journal covering French history. It publishes articles in English and French. The journal is published by Duke University Press on behalf of the Society for French Historical Studies.

History
Evelyn Acomb, a historian of French laïcité, found that France lay largely outside the scope of North American historians. In 1954, Acomb and several colleagues founded the Society for French historical Studies to be one of the leading journals in French history. The Society's journal was established in 1958 with Marvin L. Brown Jr., a diplomatic historian from North Carolina State College in Raleigh, was the first editor-in-chief. Brown remained as editor through 1966.

 it is edited by Kathryn A. Edwards and Carol E. Harrison, professors of history at the (University of South Carolina).

Further reading
 Edward Berenson and Nancy L. Green, "The Society for French Historical Studies: The Early Years", French Historical Studies 28, no. 4 (2005): 579-600.

References

External links
 

French history journals
Publications established in 1958
Multilingual journals
Quarterly journals
Duke University Press academic journals